The Svendsen Peninsula is located on the southwestern coast of Ellesmere Island, a part of the Qikiqtaaluk Region of the Canadian territory of Nunavut. Much of it is shielded from Norwegian Bay by the Raanes Peninsula (northwest) and Bjorne Peninsula (southwest).  The Svendsen Peninsula is notable for its many fiords, including  Trold, Baumann, and Vendom. Gryte Bay is in the west. Hoved Island lies offshore.

References

External links
 Photo, Starfish Bay, on the Svendsen Peninsula
 Photo, Kettle Lakes and End Moraine, Svendsen Peninsula

Ellesmere Island
Peninsulas of Qikiqtaaluk Region